This is a list of public art in Sandwell, in the West Midlands county of England. This list applies only to works of public art accessible in an outdoor public space. For example, this does not include artwork in museums.

Bearwood

Cradley Heath

Great Bridge

Oldbury

Smethwick

Tipton

Wednesbury

West Bromwich

Town Centre

Great Barr

The Hawthorns

Sandwell Valley

Dartmouth Park

References 

Sandwell
Culture in Sandwell
Public art